Aylworth is a surname. Notable people with the surname include:

John Aylworth (by 1516–1575), English politician
Ashton Aylworth (died by 1602), English politician
Edward Aylworth, MP for Callington (UK Parliament constituency)